Saifedine Alekma is a French freestyle wrestler. He won the silver medal in the 79 kg event at the 2021 European Wrestling Championships held in Warsaw, Poland.

Career 

In 2017, he was eliminated in his first match in the 86 kg event at the World Wrestling Championships held in Paris, France. In 2020, he was also eliminated in his first match in the 79 kg event at the European Wrestling Championships held in Rome, Italy.

In May 2021, he failed to qualify for the 2020 Summer Olympics at the World Olympic Qualification Tournament held in Sofia, Bulgaria. He was defeated in his first match by Taimuraz Friev of Spain.

He competed in the 79kg event at the 2022 World Wrestling Championships held in Belgrade, Serbia.

Achievements

References

External links 

 

Living people
Year of birth missing (living people)
Place of birth missing (living people)
French male sport wrestlers
European Wrestling Championships medalists
21st-century French people